Our Father is an American Netflix original documentary film directed by Lucie Jourdan and produced by Michael Petrella and Jason Blum. Its story follows former Indianapolis based fertility doctor Donald Cline, who, in a case of fertility fraud, used his own sperm to impregnate dozens of unsuspecting patients. The film was released on May 11, 2022. The film was watched for 42.60 million hours between May 8, 2022, and May 29, 2022, globally.

Reception
Response to the film is mixed.

Select reviews
 "Shocking, creepy, and – at times – just plain strange, Our Father is a documentary that proves sometimes the truth is stranger than fiction. - Collider
 "At its core, "Our Father" is a lesson for any future true-crime documentaries — that such stories are strongest when their victims are front and center. While the execution muddies the film's message, the power of its subjects shines through the clouds." - Duke Chronicle
Director Lucie Jourdan’s "Our Father," a frustrating, tawdry documentary, rips a headline for trashy dramatic beats. - RogerEbert.com

References

External links 
 
 
 

2022 documentary films
2022 films
2020s American films
2020s English-language films
American documentary films
Documentary films about crime in the United States
Films about medical malpractice
Films shot in Indiana
Netflix original documentary films
Blumhouse Productions films